David Watkins is a British special effects artist. He was nominated for an Academy Award in the category Best Visual Effects for the film The Midnight Sky.

Selected filmography 
 The Midnight Sky (2020; co-nominated with Matt Kasmir, Chris Lawrence and Max Solomon)

References

External links 

Living people
Place of birth missing (living people)
Year of birth missing (living people)
Special effects people